Lucas Santos Siqueira (born 23 September 1988), known as Lucas Siqueira or simply Lucas, is a Brazilian footballer who plays as a defensive midfielder for Ituano.

Honours

Macaé
Campeonato Brasileiro Série C: 2014

Vasco da Gama
Campeonato Carioca: 2015

Paysandu
Copa Verde: 2016
Campeonato Paraense: 2016

Ceará
Campeonato Cearense: 2017

Remo
Copa Verde: 2021

External links

1988 births
Living people
Sportspeople from Rio de Janeiro (state)
Brazilian footballers
Association football midfielders
Campeonato Brasileiro Série A players
Campeonato Brasileiro Série B players
Campeonato Brasileiro Série C players
Campeonato Brasileiro Série D players
Friburguense Atlético Clube players
Macaé Esporte Futebol Clube players
CR Vasco da Gama players
Paysandu Sport Club players
Ceará Sporting Club players
Grêmio Novorizontino players
Clube de Regatas Brasil players
Associação Portuguesa de Desportos players
Clube do Remo players
Ituano FC players
People from Bom Jardim